SFCC is an acronym for:

Colleges
St. Francis' Canossian College, in Wan Chai, Hong Kong
Santa Fe College, in Gainesville, Florida, U.S. (formerly Santa Fe Community College)
Santa Fe Community College, in Santa Fe, New Mexico, U.S.
Spokane Falls Community College, in Spokane, Washington, U.S.
State Fair Community College in Sedalia, Missouri, U.S.

Other uses
 "SFCC", a song by The Mentors from the 1986 album Up the Dose
 Salesforce B2C Commerce Cloud, an Ecommerce platform formerly known as Demandware
 Sisters for Christian Community